Andhera (The Darkness) is a 1975 Bollywood revenge thriller film directed by Tulsi and Shyam Ramsay

Cast
 Sameer Khan as Deepak
 Rajesh
 Helen
 Tun Tun
 Sandesh Kohli
 Major Anand
 Ashoo
 Bhagwan
 Krishan Dhawan
 Dulari
 Vani Ganpati
 Hiralal
 Satyendra Kapoor
 Seema Kapoor
 Imtiaz Khan
 Mukri
 Murad
 Arvind Pandya
 Shekhar Purohit

Songs
"Rang Dunga Sabko Mai Pyar Bhari BatoMe" - Kishore Kumar
"Husn Aur Shaarab Ka Jo Rishta Hai" - Asha Bhosle
"Holi Hai Re Holi Hai" - Kishore Kumar
"Kuch To Samjho Aati Hai Kisliye Jawani" - Asha Bhosle

References

External links
 

1975 films
1970s Hindi-language films
Films scored by Sonik-Omi
Indian slasher films
Films directed by Shyam Ramsay
Films directed by Tulsi Ramsay